The Greek economic miracle (Greek: Ελληνικό οικονομικό θαύμα) describes a period of rapid and sustained economic growth in Greece from 1950 to 1973. At its height, the Greek economy grew by an average of 7.7 percent, second in the world only to Japan.

Background
From 1941 to 1944, Greece endured the devastating effects of World War II, including military invasion, occupation, and fierce fighting with Greek Resistance groups, which all caused unprecedented damage to the country's already-underdeveloped infrastructure and economy. Forced loans demanded by the occupying regime severely devalued the Greek drachma, while the end of the war gave way to a bitter civil war that lasted until 1949. By 1950, the relative position of the Greek economy had dramatically deteriorated: the income per capita in purchasing power terms fell from 62% of France's in 1938 to about 40% in 1949, less than a decade later.

Economic growth 

Greece's recovery began almost immediately after the end of the Greek Civil War and is attributed to several factors, including economic and foreign policy and social and cultural changes. As in other European countries, a chief catalyst were the grants and loans of the Marshall Plan. Other factors include a drastic devaluation of the drachma, attraction of foreign investments, significant development of the chemical industry, development of the services industry (especially tourism), and massive construction activity related to large infrastructure projects and the rebuilding of Greek cities. Greek political leaders such as prime minister Konstantinos Karamanlis and parliamentarians Georgios Kartalis and Spyros Markezinis are also credited with having stewarded increased investment.

Greek growth rates were highest during the 1950s, often exceeding 10%, close to those of a modern tiger economy. Industrial production also grew annually by 10% for several years, mostly in the 1960s.

Growth initially widened the economic gap between rich and poor, intensifying political divisions.

In total, the Greek GDP grew for 54 of the 60 years following World War II and the Greek Civil War.

Aftermath
Marginal GDP contractions were recorded in the 1980s, although these were partly counterbalanced by the evolution of the Greek economy during that time. Between the early 1970s and 1990s, double-digit inflation, often closer to 20% than 10%, was normal until monetary policies were changed to comply with the criteria for joining the Eurozone.

Gallery

See also
 Economic history of Greece and the Greek world
 Post–World War II economic expansion

References

Further reading
Takis Fotopoulos, "Economic restructuring and the debt problem: the Greek case," International Review of Applied Economics, Vol. 6, No. 1 (1992). Retrieved: 5 May 2010.

1950s economic history
1960s economic history
1970s economic history
1950s in Greece
1960s in Greece
1970s in Greece
Economic booms
Economic history of Greece
Post–World War II economic booms